Timothy Euan Belson (born 25 April 1951) is a British fencer. He competed in the individual and team épée events at the 1976 Summer Olympics. He was a two times British fencing champion, winning the épée title at the British Fencing Championships in 1975 and 1979.

References

1951 births
Living people
British male fencers
Olympic fencers of Great Britain
Fencers at the 1976 Summer Olympics